Sideroxylon jubilla is a species of plant in the family Sapotaceae. It is endemic to Cuba.

References

Flora of Cuba
jubilla
Vulnerable plants
Taxonomy articles created by Polbot